The 2006 Neste Oil Rally Finland was the tenth round of the 2006 World Rally Championship season. It took place between August 17–20, 2006.

Results

Special Stages
All dates and times are EEST (UTC+3).

External links

 Results at eWRC.com
 Results at Jonkka's World Rally Archive

Rally Finland, 2006
Finland
Rally Finland